The Master of Meßkirch (German: Meister von Meßkirch; active c. 1515 - 1540) was an anonymous German Renaissance painter.

Biography

The so-called Master of Meßkirch is named after the eleven altarpieces (one main altarpiece and ten auxiliary ones) he painted for the St. Martin church in Meßkirch between 1536 and 1540. His birthplace and apprenticeship are unknown, but he may have studied under an artist from the circle of Albrecht Dürer, such as Hans von Kulmbach or Hans Leonhard Schäufelein. From the 1530s onwards his works seem to display familiarity with contemporary northern Italian painting. Hans Baldung Grien was also influential to his work.

Early on he worked for Count Eitel Friedrich III of Hohenzollern in Veringenstadt. Later he was called to Meßkirch to work for Count Gottfried Werner von Zimmern.

Throughout the master's career his figures had Manneristic proportions. While early on his colors were bright and iridescent, his coloration became calmer and more muted in his last years.

His most important works include:
The Falkenstein Altarpiece (1525)
The altarpieces for Stiftskirche von St. Martin, from which more than 40 panels have been separated and are held in the collections of European and American museums.

Citations

References
 Feuerstein, Heinrich (1933). Der Meister von Meßkirch im Lichte der neuesten Funde und Forschungen. Freiburg: Urban Verlag
 Moraht-Fromm, Anna; Hans Westhoff (1997). Der Meister von Meßkirch. Forschungen zur südwestdeutschen Malerei des 16. Jahrhunderts. Ulm: Süddeutsche Verlags-Gesellschaft. .

German Renaissance painters
Anonymous artists
1500s deaths
Year of birth uncertain
16th-century German painters